Panambur Beach is a beach in the city of Mangalore in the Indian state of Karnataka.

This beach is on the shores of Arabian sea and is credited as one of the safest and best maintained beaches of India. It is the most popular, well connected and the most visited beach of Karnataka.

The beach is located in the place called Panambur 10 km north of the City center  which comes under the  administration of Mangalore City Corporation.

As of now this beach is maintained by a private enterprise under the banner of Panambur Beach Tourism Development Project. Other attractions include jet ski rides, boating, dolphin viewing, food stalls and is also known for its highly skilled and trained lifeguards who patrol the beach to ensure visitor safety.

This beach has been popular for its sunsets, the port area and a picnic spot for tourists and locals alike and offers views of the sunset. The beach attracts visitors due to its close proximity to the city. The ships anchored out in the sea waiting for berth in the harbor can be seen from the Beach.

The Breakwater 
Panambur beach happens to be just beside the New Mangalore Sea Port. This rock wall is actually the north rock wall or the northern breakwater of the sea port entrance. They are used to protect an anchorage from the effects of both weather and longshore drift. Walking on the breakwater rocks is forbidden. The port has to abide by International Ship and Port Facility Security (ISPS) Code and keep the breakwater free of people.

Facilities 
The beach has activities like Jet Skiing, boating, chariot rides and many more. One can enjoy long camel, horse rides as well. There are a lot of food stalls as well. Children can be entertained by joy riders that are plenty in number. The beach warms up during the carnivals. Parking facility can be utilised by visitors for two wheelers and four wheelers by paying a parking fee.

Events 

Many events such as Beach festivals and Kite festivals are occasionally organized here. Other events includes boat races, air shows and sand sculpture contests.

Kite festival 

International Kite festival is one of the major tourist attraction of this beach, where teams from around the world along with the kite enthusiasts participate in the festival. Teams from various countries such as England, France, Netherlands, Germany, Kuwait, Thailand, Australia, Singapore and Turkey have actively participated in the past. Kite enthusiasts under the name "Team Mangalore" have always been hosting Kite Festivals in this beach with the support of industrial giants such as ONGC, MRPL etc.

Beach festival 
The district administration of Dakshina Kannada also organises beach festival as part of the famous "Karavali Utsav" which translates to Coastal festival. It is said that approximately 2.5 lakh attend the beach festival. Several stalls will be put up for the public. Entertainment and stage programmes will be held across all three days which will include dance and singing competitions.

Accessibility 

Panambur Beach is well connected by public transport. There are several city buses from the main bus stop in statebank. One can also take the non-express service buses that give a stop for Panambur Beach right at the Panambur Beach road joining national highway NH-66 (older number: NH17). Once off the bus, one can take a small walk down the road leading to the beach.

Distance from:
New Mangalore Port, Mangalore- 4 km
National Institute of Technology Karnataka, Surathkal, Mangalore - 8 km
Tannirbhavi Beach, Mangalore- 9 km
Pumpwell, Mangalore - 13 km
Pilikula Nisargadhama, Mangalore - 16 km
Sasihithlu Beach,  Mangalore - 23 km
Infosys DC, Mudipu, Mangalore - 32 km
Manipal - 56 km
Dharmasthala - 81 km
Kukke Subramanya Temple - 110 km
 Kannur, Kerala - 149 km
Murdeshwar - 151 km
Gokarna, Karnataka - 226 km
Mysore - 261 km
Hubli - 353 km
Bangalore - 356 km
Panaji, Goa - 360 km

Nearest Railway Stations:
Surathkal railway station, Surathkal, Mangalore - 6 km
Mangalore Central railway station, Hampankatta, Mangalore - 14 km
Mangalore Junction railway station, Padil, Mangalore - 15 km

Nearest Airport:
 Mangalore International Airport (India) - 14 km

Climate 
Mangalore has a tropical monsoon climate and is under the direct influence of the Arabian Sea branch of the southwest monsoon.

Gallery

See also 
 Panambur
 Sasihithlu Beach
 NITK Beach
 Tannirbhavi Beach
 Ullal beach
 Someshwar Beach
 Pilikula Nisargadhama
 Kadri Park
 Tagore Park
 Bejai Museum
 Aloyseum
 Kudla Kudru

References

External links 

Beaches of Mangalore